Miguel Murillo (born September 29, 1993) is a Costa Rican judoka. He competed at the 2016 Summer Olympics in the men's 73 kg event, in which he was eliminated in the second round by Shohei Ono.

References

External links
 

1993 births
Living people
Costa Rican male judoka
Olympic judoka of Costa Rica
Judoka at the 2016 Summer Olympics